The Battle of Torches was fought in 1583 during the Ottoman–Safavid War (1578–1590). The name of the battle refers to torches used during night clashes. The battle resulted in an Ottoman victory, and had thereby secured Dagestan and Shirvan until the end of the war.

Background 

In the first phase of the war the Ottomans had been able to conquer most of the Caucasus. Özdemiroğlu Osman Pasha (Özdemir Pasha’s son) was appointed as the governor of the newly conquered territories. The capital of his province was Derbend at the Caspian coast. However, after the Ottoman army returned to its main base in Istanbul, the Persians under Imam Kulu began to regain some of their former territories. Although an army from the Crimean Khanate (which was an Ottoman vassal) under Adil Giray was sent to the Caucasus in summer 1579 as a reinforcement, they were routed by Hamza Mirza and Mirza Salman, and Adil Giray was taken prisoner, and put in Qazvin, where he was later executed. Consequently, Osman Pasha had to retreat to North Caucasus. In 1582, the Ottoman Porte sent a second reinforcing force under Cafer Pasha, the governor of Caffa, to restore Ottoman dominance in the area.

Battle 
The 50,000-strong Persians under Imam Kulu, together with Georgian irregulars, attacked again in the spring of 1583. In a  first clash by the vanguard units of both armies, the Ottomans were defeated (25 April 1583). The main clash occurred in Baştepe near Derbend on 9 May 1583. On the Ottoman side, Osman Pasha was placed in the center, Cafer Pasha was at the left flank and Haydar Pasha, the governor of Sivas, was at the right flank. On the Persian side, Imam Kulu was in the center, Rustem Khan was at the right, and Burhaneddin at the left.
The result of the battle was inconclusive at the end of the first day, but the battle continued during the night, both sides using torches. In the second day, there was a momentary pause in the combat. But in the third day, an Ottoman general attack marked the end of the battle. The Persian army was defeated and the Persian prisoners of war exceeded 3000.

Aftermath 
By this victory, the Ottomans were able to establish control over all of the Caucasus. After further Ottoman victories in the south (conquest of Tabriz) both sides agreed to conclude peace. By the Treaty of Ferhat Pasha of 1590, Persians acknowledged Ottoman gains in both the Caucasus and modern Azerbaijan as well as West Iran. But these gains were not long lasting, as they were reversed in the next Ottoman–Safavid War.

References 

Torches
Torches
Torches
16th century in Iran
1583 in the Ottoman Empire
Torches
History of Dagestan
Night battles
Torches